Helcogramma kranos, known commonly as the helmet triplefin, is a species of triplefin blenny in the genus Helcogramma. It was described by Fricke in 1997. This species is endemic to the islands of Komodo, Lombok, Nusa Tenggara Barat and Timor in Indonesia.

References

Helmet triplefin
Fish described in 1997